Jayesh Vidyadhar Salgaonkar is an Indian politician and member of the Bharatiya Janata Party. Salgaonkar was a member of the Goa Legislative Assembly from the Saligao constituency in North Goa district. He was the Minister of Ports, Rural Development Agency and Housing with Housing Board department in Manohar Parrikar ministry. Salgaonkar was  dropped from Pramod Sawant’s council of ministers after 10 Congress lawmakers joined the BJP in July 2019 and the BJP didn’t need Goa Forward's support.

In April 2021, Goa Forward left the NDA. By December 2021, rumors began circulating that Salgaonkar would be quitting Goa Forward to join the BJP. Stating that he has not acted to quell the rumours, GFP sent a show-cause notice to Salgaonkar. In response, Salgaonkar quit the Goa Forward Party and was inducted into the BJP. His entry into the BJP was met with strong opposition from a section of the BJP cadre.

References 

People from North Goa district
Goa Forward Party politicians
Members of the Goa Legislative Assembly
Living people
Goa MLAs 2017–2022
Goa politicians
Year of birth missing (living people)
Bharatiya Janata Party politicians from Goa